Joseph Robert Janes (born May 23, 1935) is a Canadian author born in Toronto.

A mining engineer by profession, he taught geology, geography and high school mathematics and later geology at Brock University until he dedicated himself to writing full-time in 1970.

Janes has published more than 20 adult novels, five mystery novels for young adults, and textbooks on the subject of geology. His character-rich mysteries set in Occupied France during World War II, and featuring Chief Inspector Jean-Louis St-Cyr of the Sûreté and Detektiv Inspektor Hermann Kohler of the Nazi Gestapo, are his most popular works and have been critically acclaimed by The Wall Street Journal, amongst others, for their historical accuracy. The U.S.-based Western Society for French History used his writings as a study of the convergence of fiction with history.

St-Cyr and Kohler series 

 Mayhem (1992)
 Carousel (1992)
 Kaleidoscope (1993)
 Salamander (1994)
 Mannequin (1994)
 Dollmaker (1995)
 Stonekiller (1995)
 Sandman (1996)
 Gypsy (1997)
 Madrigal (1999)
 Beekeeper (2001)
 Flykiller (2002)
 Bellringer (2012)
 Tapestry (2013)
 Carnival (2014)
 Clandestine (2015)

Other works 
 The Odd-Lot Boys and the Tree-Fort War (1976)
 The Toy Shop (1981)
 Danger on the River (1982)
 The Watcher (1982)
 The Third Story (1983)
 The Hiding Place (1984)
 Murder in the Market (1985)
 Spies for Dinner (1985)
 The Alice Factor (1991)
 The Hunting Ground (2013)
 Betrayal (2014)
 The Sleeper (2015)
 The Little Parachute (2016)

References

External links
J. Robert Janes Archive at McMaster University
 Pierce, J. Kingston. “Solving Crimes in the Shadow of War” The Rap Sheet, May 30, 2012.

1935 births
Brock University alumni
Academic staff of Brock University
Canadian mystery writers
Living people